Sunchon National University (Acronym: SNU; Korean, Suncheon Daehakgyo, colloquially Suncheondae) is a national research university founded in 1935, located in Suncheon, Jeollanam-do, South Korea.

SNU composes six colleges and five professional schools, and a student body of about 26,000. College of Life Science and Natural Resources, College of Social Sciences, College of Humanities and Arts, College of Engineering, College of Education, and College of Pharmacy.

Also various and differentiated programs such as human resources exchanges with overseas leading universities, global overseas training, overseas culture expedition, etc. The university maintains an undergraduate exchange program with the University of Sheffield, University of Oklahoma, and University of Missouri.

History
Sunchon National University was founded in 1935 as 'Sunchon Public Agriculture School' when U-Seok Kim Jong Ik donated a special land as an academic venue to cultivate talents and inspire national consciousness.

It then was renamed to Sunchon Agricultural Middle School (1946), Sunchon Agricultural High School (1951), Sunchon Agricultural Technical High School (1965), Sunchon Agricultural Polytechnic (1973) followed by an elevation to Sunchon Agricultural College in 1979 registering as a tertiary education institute.
In 1982, it fully fledged into a four-year university, starting anew with ten departments. In 1987, it established graduate schools and evolved into a full four-year university with five colleges in 1991. Graduate School of Education (1993), Graduate School of Industries (1994), Graduate School of Business & Public Administration (1995) and Graduate School of Information & Science (1996) opened up in series and doctor's course was newly added in 1994.

The same year, Sunchon National University received 10 billion Won in contribution from POSCO for local talent cultivation with which Lifelong Education Center under Sunchon National University Academic Scholarship Foundation was established to provide re-training to local residents and contribute to local economic growth alongside Language Institute and Farming Education Center.

In 2001, Sunchon National University opened state-of-the-art Central Library, Center for Information & Electronic Calculation and built e-library to serve as sources for knowledge and information.
Drive for university reform and internal innovations led to Sunchon National University being designated as a specialized university in agriculture and awarded as party to government-run projects including BK 21. In 2005, Sunchon National University was ranked 17th out of 183 universities nationwide from the Ministry of Education, Science & Technology in the category of financial support and 10th among 44 national universities in school innovation.

In 2002, it was selected as a top-tier university in education and research attainments in assessment of national university's own development plans, winning recognition as the education institute on the growth track.

Before College Status
 1935. 04. 25 Approved as a provincial school with special land contribution of Kim Jong Ik
 1935. 05. 15 Opened as "Sunchon Public Agricultural School"
 1946. 11. 26 Approved to be reorganized as "Sunchon Middle School of Agriculture and Forestry"
 1951. 09. 01 Reorganized as "Sunchon High School of Agriculture and Forestry"
 1965. 01. 22 Approved for reorganizing as "Sunchon vocational school of agriculture and forestry"
 1979. 03. 01 Approved to be reorganized as "Sunchon Junior College of Agriculture"

In 1980's
 1982. 02. 15 Approved for reorganizing as "Sunchon college"
 1982. 03. 10 Opened as "Sunchon College" and Mr. Lee Sang Rae was inaugurated as the first rector
 1986. 03. 01 Dr. Park Myung Kyu was inaugurated as the second rector
 1987. 11. 09 Approved for establishing Graduate School(the master's course)
 1989. 03. 01 Approved for 5 department systems
(departments of Agriculture, Education, Humanities, Engineering and Natural Science)

In 1990's
 1990. 03. 01 Dr. Kim Jin Ho was inaugurated as the third rector
 1991. 02. 28 Approved to be reorganized as "Sunchon National University"
 1991. 03. 01 Dr. Kim Jin Ho was inaugurated as the first president
 1991. 10. 22 Approved for establishing College of Education
 1993. 09. 03 Approved for establishing Graduate School of Education(the master's course)
 1994. 04. 02 Academic scholarship foundation of Sunchon National University was established
 1994. 10. 20 Approved for establishing Industrial Graduate School(the master's course)
 1995. 03. 01 Mr. Choi Deok Won was inaugurated as the second president
 1995. 10. 18 Approved for establishing Graduate School of Management and Administration
 1996. 06. 21 Approved for establishing an in-service training institute under the college of education for the faculty
of middle school
 1996. 11. 02 Approved for establishing Graduate School of Information Science
 1997. 07. 14 Establishing a technology center for spice vegetables under the College of Agriculture
 1997. 09. 12 Training Center of Sunchon National University opened
 1998. 10. 21 Dr. Huh Sang Man was inaugurated as the third president
 1998. 12. 17 Lifelong education center was established
 1999. 06. 18 Comprehensive service center for students opened
 1999. 10. 28 The second Humanity building was completed
 1999. 11. 08 Establishment of sisterhood was contracted with Taiwan National University
 1999. 12. 15 Enterprise inaugurating center was completed
 1999. 12. 22 Center of regional agricultural information and technical assistance was established

After 2000

 2000. 07. 29 International academic interchange was contracted with Osaka University in Japan
 2000. 08. 16 International academic interchange was contracted with Idaho University in USA
 2000. 08. 18 International academic interchange was contracted with Central Washington Univer
 Association and Sunchon National University's Farming Education Centersity in USA
 2000. 09. 25 Trade of Jeonnam agricultural pProduce(pear) was contracted between Taiwan Agricultural Training
 2000. 10. 04 Student welfare center(management building of dormitory) opened
 2000. 11. 14 Joint experimental practice center was completed
 2000. 12. 02 Woo Jeong Won(examination center) was completed
 2000. 12. 26 The second Educating building was completed
 2001. 06. 13 Academic information center was completed
 2001. 08. 16 International academic interchange was contracted with Guangxi College of Education in China
 2001. 09. 15 International academic interchange was contracted with Zawaharlal Nehru University in India
 2002. 08. 31 Natural education center was established
 2002. 10. 10 Dormitory(HyangLimGwan) opened
 2002. 10. 21 Dr. Kim Jae Gi was inaugurated as the fourth president
 2003. 05. 01 In-service training institute for directors of practical physical education opened
 2003. 07. 31 Re-agreement was contracted with Peking University of Science and Technology in China
 2003. 08. 30 Science education center for talented youths was established
 2003. 09. 20 e-Campus was constructed
 2003. 12. 09 Industry-academy cooperation foundation was established
 2003. 12. 10 Selected as the main university of Jeonnam Techno Park
 2004. 01. 28 Technology transfer center was established
 2004. 06. 16 Selected for New University for Regional Innovation(NURI)
 2004. 07. 20 Selected as the main university of Industry-academic cooperation
 2004. 07. 30 The third engineering center was completed
 2004. 08. 10 Selected for Regional Research Center(RRC) business of 2005
 2004. 08. 12 Selected for Gurye research institute for wild flowers business
 Agreement on the Specialized Regional Innovation Project for Boseong Green Tea Industry
 Agreement on Gimchi Producing Project, Gwangju-Jeonnam Province
 2004. 09. 01 Agreement on Project Promotion, Core University of Industrial-Educational Cooperation.
 2004. 11. 09 The renovation of the main administration building was completed : 293.27 m2
 2004. 11. 10 Gwangyang task force of industry-academy cooperation university was established
 2004. 11. 16 Interchange agreement was contracted with Choyang University of Technology in Taiwan
 2004. 11. 25 Industry-academy cooperation agreement was made with Small-medium Business Technology Innovation Center, Inc One company-one professor system agreement was made as an industry-academy cooperation university
 2004. 12. 17 Interchange agreement was made with Whatcom Community College in USA
 2005. 04. 11 Establishment of sisterhood was contracted with Buryatia University in Russia
 2005. 04. 15 Establishment of sisterhood was contracted with Queensland Language Center in Australia
 2005. 04. 18 Establishment of sisterhood was contracted with Oklahoma University in USA
 2005. 04. 25 Establishment of sisterhood was contracted with Qinghai University in China
 2005. 06. 07 Establishment of sisterhood was contracted with Beppu University in Japan
 2005. 06. 16 Establishment of sisterhood was contracted with Language Center of Christ Church University in New Zealand
 2005. 07. 14 Establishment of sisterhood was contracted with Plant Institute of Chinese Academy of Science in China
 2005. 08. 19 Establishment of sisterhood was contracted with Oita University in Japan
 2005. 08. 25 70th Year Memorial Hall was completed
 2005. 09. 12 Establishment of sisterhood was contracted with Ryukyus University in Japan
 2005. 10. 05 Estates and buildings of Suncheon branch court of Gwangju district court were undertaken
 2005. 10. 07 Construction of Jirisan Cultural Research Institute was begun
 2005. 12. 16 Synthetic support agreement on entry authority was contracted with Industrial Property Office
 2006. 01. 25 Estates and buildings of Suncheon branch office of Gwangju district public prosecutor's office were undertaken
 2006. 03. 13 Establishment of sisterhood was contracted with Taitung National University in Taiwan
 2006. 04. 11 Establishment of sisterhood was contracted with Ningbo University in China
 2006. 05. 01 Establishment of sisterhood was contracted with Hebei University of Technology in China
 2006. 10. 21 Dr. Jang Man Chae was inaugurated as the fifth president

Facilities

Library
Sunchon National University Library is located in the middle of the campus. The library was established in 1979, and has collected and offered various data which are needed for investigations and studies. In 1992, the library was opened fully for more effective data utilization, and in 1996, database was constructed by academic informative system based on web. In December 2001, it was enlarged for increasing data, effective management of information and active services. Now, we are trying to construct electronic library and information supplying system, through hightech communication techniques (E-mail contents service (SDI), copy service of original texts, VOD service). To cope with demands of professional information and millennium era, various service systems are being constructed for supporting all sorts of academic investigations.

Museum
The museum collects, preserves and exhibits valuable materials of various areas including antiquities, humanities, history, ethnic customs, arts, natural science and folk culture. These collections can help faculty and students by offering investigation materials.

Language Institute
The institute calls in the best instructors for high-quality linguistic service, and operates various programs for linguistic studies.  Foreign faculty are housed either in an on-campus dormitory or off-campus in apartments.  Contracts typically run for one year at a time and faculty are given the opportunity to teach not only university students but working adults as well.

Life-long Education Center

Human Resources Development Center
The center has been operating various job-seeking programs such as job-seeking counseling, psychological counseling, and academic affairs.

International Affair

The Language Institute was established in Apr.2008.

Academic-Indestrial Cooperation Organization
This is an agency founded for innovating regional industries by spreading technologies of SNU to industrial foundations. To lead this innovation, commercial ties would be strengthened and various associated programs are managed to support family companies.
It also participates actively on various national enterprises managed by the government to complete practical foundation of industry-academic cooperation. It will furthermore supports not only enterprises but also regional innovation.

Dormitories
Sunchon National University boasts one of the finest dormitories in South Korea. The dormitories consist of 5 buildings(Cheongwoongwan, Hyangrimgwan 2, Changjogwan for male and Hyangrimgwan 1&3, Jinligwan for female) and 1 administrative building. Female dormitory is in the form of the latest apartment, and each room has LAN facility. Each dormitory buildings have computer room, resting room, laundry, and various convenient facilities, and also provide high speed internet access, communication systems, and support facilities.

International rankings
URAP World University Rankings (2013) considered it 1351st in the worldQS World University Rankings (2013/14) considered it 201st in Asia 4ICU World University Rankings (2013) considered it 36th in Korea

Notable alumni

Arts and literature
 Kim Sung-hwan, cartoonist
 Park Yong-je, cartoonist
 Kim Jae-hyeon, cartoonist
 Jung Han-na, cartoonist
 Son Gyu-ho, cartoonist
 Oh min-hong, cartoonist
 Youn Soe, cartoonist
 Park Yoon-young, writer and artist
 Choi Bo-ram, writer

Politics
 Kim Gwang-jin, 19th member of the National Assembly in South Korea (2012~2016)

Business
 Jang Yung-sik, founder and CEO of Yungsan

Sports
 Han Sang-yong, E-sports coach

Academia
 Lee, In-hyuk, Professor at University of Georgia

See also
List of national universities in South Korea
List of universities and colleges in South Korea
Education in Korea

References

External links
Official website

Educational institutions established in 1935
Suncheon
Universities and colleges in South Jeolla Province
1935 establishments in Korea
National universities and colleges in South Korea